Penny auction may refer to several types of auction:
 Bidding fee auction, in which participants must pay a fee to the seller in order to place each bid;
 Penny auction (foreclosure), in which participants collectively discourage competitive bidding in order to force the sale a foreclosed property at a low price.